Eudora USD 491 is a public unified school district headquartered in Eudora, Kansas, United States.  The district includes the communities of Eudora, Hesper, and nearby rural areas.

Schools
The school district operates the following schools:
 Eudora High School
 Eudora Middle School
 Eudora Elementary School
 Eudora Early Childhood Program
Others:
 Eudora-DeSoto Technical Education Center
 Eudora Virtual Learning Center

History
The district originated from the first municipal school facility, then in city hall, circa 1856.

See also
 Kansas State Department of Education
 Kansas State High School Activities Association
 List of high schools in Kansas
 List of unified school districts in Kansas

References

External links
 

School districts in Kansas
Education in Douglas County, Kansas
School districts established in 1856
1856 establishments in Kansas Territory